is a fighting game with action role-playing elements developed by Koei Tecmo's Team Ninja and published by Square Enix for Microsoft Windows and PlayStation 4. 

The game is a follow-up to Dissidia Final Fantasy and Dissidia 012 Final Fantasy, released for PlayStation Portable, and similarly allows players to battle one another using many characters from the Final Fantasy series. 

The game is a console port of the 2015 Japanese arcade game , and it was released worldwide in January 2018.

Gameplay
Dissidia Final Fantasy NTs battle system was redesigned from the ground up, though some elements from the previous titles have been retained. Characters are divided into four combat classes: power-based Vanguards, agility-based Assassins, range-based Marksmen, and unique trait-based Specialists. Characters can perform Brave attacks, which increase the player's Bravery level based on the amount of damage done. If an opponent is attacked while their Bravery is at zero, a Bravery Break will be triggered, giving the player a substantial Bravery boost. Players can also perform HP attacks that will do direct damage to an opponent based on their current Bravery level. Using HP attacks will reset the player's Bravery back to zero, forcing them to perform more Brave attacks before they can directly attack their opponent again. The previous games' EX Mode has been tweaked, with players able to equip one HP attack and two EX Skills per character in battle.

Unlike past Dissidia titles, NT places a focus on three-on-three combat, with players actively controlling one character while the in-game AI controls the other two. Each character has its own HP meter, along with a Party HP meter, Stamina meter, and Summon meter for the whole team. When a character is defeated, a segment will be removed from their team's Party HP meter; when the meter is depleted, the team loses the battle. Energy from the Stamina meter is expended when the player performs a dash or dodge to limit overuse; the meter will quickly recharge if the player remains on the ground for a short time. Players can use their shield or dodge to defend themselves, though the shield will deteriorate over time. Players can also fill their Summon gauge by attacking foes or destroying Summoning Crystals. By filling their team's Summon gauge, players can perform summons to call one of seven creatures such as Ifrit or Bahamut to attack their enemies, as well as grant passive buffs to the player's team.

In addition to Standard Battles, NT features a second battle type in the form of Core Battles. These involve each team being given a large crystal to protect, which their opponent must attempt to destroy; the team whose crystal is destroyed first loses the battle. The game features several types of single-player arcade ladders, in which a player's team must defeat a series of increasingly-difficult AI opponents. These will sometimes conclude with a Bonus Battle, in which the player's team must defeat one of the game's seven Summons in a battle for additional points. The game also supports online multiplayer battles, with players able to form teams of three to battle opposing teams.

By participating in online and offline battles, players will earn experience points to increase their Player Level and individual character levels. As characters level up, they will receive rewards such as new HP attacks. Increasing the Player Level will grant additional rewards such as new EX Skills, Summons, and Memoria Tokens, the latter of which must be acquired to progress in the game's Story Mode.

Plot
Set long after the events of the previous two Dissidia titles, but before the arcade version, the dimension of World B is revitalized for a conflict between  the goddess of protection, and  the god of destruction, who respectively summon the warriors of Cosmos and Chaos as their champions. Unlike their prior involvements, the summoned warriors retain their memories of both the previous war and their original worlds, which are used to expand World B, while the mystical energy created from their battles maintains it.

Suspicious of the gods' unfamiliarity with their world and each other, Materia's warriors immediately separate to investigate the reason behind the new conflict. They learn from the world's summons that both gods were created from Cosmos's desire to protect the world. They also discover a separate threat in the form of "planesgorgers"—manifestations of Shinryu, the draconic being responsible for creating the previous cycle of war between Cosmos and Chaos—which threaten to absorb the world's energy and eradicate the world. When the world becomes overwhelmed by planesgorgers, the two sides form a truce to vanquish Shinryu himself, leading to a deliberate clash that lures him out. The warriors destroy Shinryu and return to their respective worlds, leaving behind duplicates of themselves with their memories of World B so that they may continue fighting on the gods' behalf.

Characters
Dissidia Final Fantasy NT features 38 playable fighters. The arcade version featured fourteen characters at launch, including thirteen heroes from the previous Dissidia titles and a new hero from Final Fantasy XIV, with new characters continuously added to the roster via post-launch updates. The base roster of NT included every character available in the arcade version at the time of its release, totaling 28. Ten new characters were added to the arcade version first before releasing on PlayStation 4 as DLC after a short window of exclusivity. NT is the first Dissidia game to include characters from Final Fantasy spin-offs such as Tactics and Type 0.

New characters to the franchise are listed below in bold.

{| class="wikitable"
|-
! Game of origin 
! Available at arcade release
! Available at home release
! Available after home release 
|-
|Final Fantasy
|Warrior of Light||Garland||
|-
|Final Fantasy II
|Firion||The Emperor||
|-
|Final Fantasy III
|Onion Knight||Cloud of Darkness||
|-
|Final Fantasy IV
|Cecil Harvey||Kain Highwind, Golbez||
|-
|Final Fantasy V
|Bartz Klauser||Exdeath||
|-
|Final Fantasy VI
|Terra Branford||Kefka Palazzo|| Locke Cole|-
|Final Fantasy VII
|Cloud Strife||Sephiroth||Tifa Lockhart
|-
|Final Fantasy VIII
|Squall Leonhart||Ultimecia|| Rinoa Heartilly|-
|Final Fantasy IX
|Zidane Tribal||Kuja||
|-
|Final Fantasy X
|Tidus||Jecht||Yuna
|-
|Final Fantasy XI
|Shantotto|| ||Kam'lanaut|-
|Final Fantasy XII
|Vaan|| ||Vayne Carudas Solidor''', Gabranth
|-
|Final Fantasy XIII
|Lightning|| ||Snow Villiers
|-
|Final Fantasy XIV
|Y'shtola Rhul|| ||Zenos yae Galvus
|-
|Final Fantasy XV
| || Noctis Lucis Caelum||Ardyn Izunia
|-
|Final Fantasy Tactics
| ||Ramza Beoulve||
|-
|Final Fantasy Type-0
| ||Ace||
|}

Development and release
Dissidia Final Fantasy NT was developed by Team Ninja. It was originally announced as an arcade title during the Japan Amusement Expo (JAEPO) trade show in Chiba, Japan on February 14, 2015. The game was developed with the core technology of the PlayStation 4. Square Enix wanted to release it for arcades first, while a console version would not be in development until at least a year after the launch of the arcade version. During development, Team Ninja considered using their 'soft engine' that allowed skin textures to appear softer, but decided not to due to not enough characters taking advantage of the benefits. The Arcade version launched in Japan on November 26, 2015.

Director Takeo Kujiraoka hinted at the possibility of adding Noctis Lucis Caelum to the cast once Final Fantasy XV was released; Noctis was officially revealed at Sony's Tokyo Game Show conference on September 19, 2017. Kujiraoka also mentioned the possibility of the game becoming an eSport and being released outside of Japan.

A console version was discussed as being in development but required features such as a story mode and further gameplay refinement before release. In June 2017, the PlayStation 4 port was formally announced under the name Dissidia Final Fantasy NT. The NT in the title was confirmed to have multiple meanings such as "New Trial", "New Tournament", and "New Tale". The scenario for Dissidia NT was written Kazushige Nojima—who also acted as a supervisor for the game—based on a draft by Dissidia and Final Fantasy XV writer Saori Itamuro. The PlayStation 4 version was released on January 30, 2018. On March 12, 2019 a free-to-play version was released for PlayStation 4 and Microsoft Windows via Steam.

On February 18, 2020, it was announced that updates for the game would cease and no additional characters would be added, with no current plans for a sequel. The developers initially targeted a total roster of 50 characters, including all those from the previous Dissidia titles. Characters not returning from Dissidia 012 include Gilgamesh, Laguna, Prishe, and Feral Chaos. Dataminers previously revealed the aforementioned characters, excluding Feral Chaos, as well as Zack Fair and Vivi Ornitier may have been planned to be implemented at some point.

Reception
The original arcade version, called Dissidia Final Fantasy, sold over 3,000 arcade cabinets and generated strong revenue in Japan during the fiscal year 2015. The game was included at the Evo 2017 eSports event.

The PlayStation 4 version, Dissidia Final Fantasy NT, sold 105,667 copies within its first week on sale in Japan, making it the best-selling game of the week in the country. It sold 134,100 units in Japan by January 28, 2018. The game was well received by Famitsu on their issue 1521, scoring 9/9/9/8 [35/40], but received mixed reviews outside of Japan. It received praise for its innovative three-on-three combat system and fan service, but received criticism for its user interface, online matchmaking and lack of content.

In the company's 2018 third-quarter results presentation, Square Enix stated the game's sales were below expectations, adding that they hoped future promotions will be able to grow the game, along with new updates and additional content.

The game was nominated for "Costume Design" at the National Academy of Video Game Trade Reviewers Awards, but lost to Red Dead Redemption 2.

The game reached number 5 in the PlayStation Store download chart.

Notes

References

External links

NT
2015 video games
3D fighting games
Arcade video games
Crossover fighting games
Crossover role-playing video games
Fighting role-playing video games
Free-to-play video games
PlayStation 4 games
Fighting games
Video games developed in Japan
Video games scored by Takeharu Ishimoto
Windows games